The Progress Rocket Space Centre, formerly known as TsSKB-Progress, is a Russian joint-stock company under the jurisdiction of Roscosmos State Corporation responsible for space science and aerospace research. It was the developer of the famous Soyuz-FG rocket that was used for crewed space flight, as well as the Soyuz-U that was used for launching uncrewed probes.

Overview 
Progress Centre was the developer and manufacturer of the Soyuz FG series of launch vehicles that were used for human spaceflight launches, and the Soyuz-U series that were used for robotic spacecraft launches. Commercial marketing of these launch vehicles was handled by the company Starsem. TsSKB-Progress' satellite products include the Foton and Foton-M science satellite series, the Yantar military satellites and the Resurs DK Earth resource satellite.

The company's main production facilities are located in the city of Samara, Russia. They include a design bureau, a large R-7 factory called Progress and an affiliate design bureau KB Foton. Up to 25,000 people work in the Progress factory; of them, 5,000 work in rocket and satellite systems, and 360 work on the R-7 production line at any given time. After the dissolution of the Soviet Union, the factory has also diversified into machine tools, vodka and sweets.

History 
In 1941, the State Aviation Plant No.1 was moved from Moscow to the city now known as Samara, Russia, near the Volga River. The plant, named Dooks, had been created in 1917, using facilities in Moscow which had previously been used for the manufacture of bicycles, motorcycles, and various other vehicles. Before World War II, the plant had manufactured several aeroplane models at the Moscow location, including the Mikoyan-Gurevich MiG-3. During the war, the plant manufactured Ilyushin Il-2 and Ilyushin Il-10 aircraft. In 1946, it began production of Mikoyan-Gurevich MiG-9 and Mikoyan-Gurevich MiG-15 jet fighters, and in 1954, it started to produce Tupolev Tu-16 bombers.

On 2 January 1958, the Soviet Union government ordered State Aviation Plant No.1 to begin production of R-7 Semyorka rockets.

The Central Specialized Design Bureau (TsSKB) was established on 30 June 1974. Dmitri Kozlov, who had been the chief designer of the R-7 and a Deputy Chief Designer of ОКB-1, was appointed General Designer of TsSKB on 6 July 1983.

On 12 April 1996, two Russian aerospace organizations, the Central Specialized Design Bureau, TsSKB, and the Samara Progress plant were merged to form TsSKB-Progress.

In 2003, A.N. Kirilin was appointed as General Director of "TsSKB-Progress", and D.I. Kozlov became its Honorary General Designer.

Rockets and missiles 
 Molniya-M
 Rus-M
 Soyuz FG
 Soyuz-U
 Soyuz-U2
 Soyuz-1
 Soyuz-2
 Volga

Satellites 

 Bion
 Zenit

 Foton

 Resurs

 Yantar

 Orlets

 Persona

 Pion-NKS

 Lotos

See also 

 United Rocket and Space Corporation

References

External links 
 Website

Roscosmos divisions and subsidiaries
Rocket engine manufacturers of Russia
Companies based in Samara, Russia
Aerospace companies of the Soviet Union